Saint-Étienne-de-Fursac (Limousin: Furçac (Sent Estefe)) is a former commune in the Creuse department in central France. On 1 January 2017, it was merged into the new commune Fursac.

Population

See also
Communes of the Creuse department

References

Former communes of Creuse
Populated places disestablished in 2017